James Earl McAuley (August 19, 1891 – April 6, 1928) born in Wichita, Kansas, USA, was a shortstop for the Pittsburgh Pirates (1914–16), St. Louis Cardinals (1917) and Chicago Cubs (1925).

In five seasons he played in sixty-four games and had 179 at bats, fourteen runs, forty-four hits, eight doubles, two triples, thirteen RBI, one stolen base, eleven walks, a .246 batting average, a .293 on-base percentage, a .313 slugging percentage, fifty-six total bases and thirteen sacrifice hits.

He died in Des Moines, Iowa at the age of thirty-six.

Sources

1891 births
1928 deaths
Major League Baseball shortstops
Baseball players from Kansas
Pittsburgh Pirates players
St. Louis Cardinals players
Chicago Cubs players
Waterloo Jays players
Youngstown Steelmen players
Rochester Hustlers players
Montreal Royals players
Kansas City Blues (baseball) players
Los Angeles Angels (minor league) players
Minneapolis Millers (baseball) players
Fort Worth Panthers players